Dimitrios Melikiotis (born 10 July 1996) is a Greek professional footballer who plays as a forward for Gamma Ethniki club Iraklis.

Club career

Veria
Melikiotis signed his professional contract on 6 February 2014. So far he didn't make his official squad debut, though he was selected during 2013–14 season, three times as first team substitute. Despite his young age, he was selected by his current coach Georgios Georgiadis to join the team in there pre-season tour in Arnhem. He made his professional debut against PAS Giannina in a 2–0 away defeat.

AEK Athens
On 2 January 2017, Melikiotis signed a 4-and-a-half year contract with AEK Athens. On 25 January 2017 he made his debut for AEK in the Greek Cup and provided an assist to Anastasios Bakasetas in what would prove to be the only goal in the 1–0 away win against Levadiakos.

Kerkyra (loan)
On 16 August 2017 Melikiotis joined Kerkyra on a season-long loan.

Volos
On 11 July 2018, he joined Volos on a three-year contract.

International career
On 4 October 2016, Antonis Nikopolidis head coach of Greece national under-21 football team called up Melikiotis for the first time ever in his career to the national team for the games against Hungary and Israel.

Honours
AEK Athens
Superleague: 2017–18

Veria
Gamma Ethniki: 2018–19 (2nd Group)
Imathia Cup: 2018–19

References

External links

1996 births
Living people
Footballers from Veria
Greek footballers
Greece under-21 international footballers
Association football midfielders
Super League Greece players
AEK Athens F.C. players
Veria F.C. players
PAE Kerkyra players
Iraklis Thessaloniki F.C. players
Edessaikos F.C. players
Volos N.F.C. players